Baron Kennet, of the Dene in the County of Wiltshire, is a title in the Peerage of the United Kingdom. It was created in 1935 for the journalist and politician Sir Hilton Young. He was the youngest son of Sir George Young, 3rd Baronet, of Formosa Place. He was succeeded by his son, the second Baron. He was a writer and politician.  the title is held by his son, the third Baron, who succeeded in 2009. As a great-grandson of Sir George Young, 3rd Baronet, of Formosa Place, he is also in remainder to this title.

The first Baron was married to the sculptor Kathleen Scott, widow of the polar explorer Robert Falcon Scott, the second to Elizabeth Young, Lady Kennet.

Barons Kennet (1935)
(Edward) Hilton Young, 1st Baron Kennet (1879–1960)
Wayland Hilton Young, 2nd Baron Kennet (1923–2009)
William Aldus Thoby Young, 3rd Baron Kennet (born 1957)

The heir apparent is the present holder's son the Honourable Archibald Wayland Keyes Young (born 1992).

Arms

See also
Young baronets of Formosa Place

References

Kidd, Charles, Williamson, David (editors). Debrett's Peerage and Baronetage (1990 edition). New York: St Martin's Press, 1990.

Baronies in the Peerage of the United Kingdom
Noble titles created in 1935
Noble titles created for UK MPs